The Curtiss XF13C (Model 70) was a carrier-based fighter aircraft built by Curtiss Aeroplane and Motor Company.

Development and design
The XF13C was a naval fighter featuring an all-metal construction, with a semi-monocoque fuselage, manually retractable landing gear and an enclosed cockpit. The aircraft was designed to facilitate conversions from biplane to monoplane and vice versa. The United States Navy bought a prototype, designated XF13C-1 when in monoplane configuration, and XF13C-2 when a biplane.

The XF13C first flew in 1934 with good results realized in tests. In 1935, the aircraft received a more powerful engine and modifications to the overly tall tailplanes. The designation was changed to XF13C-3 for more flight testing.

Operational history
No production orders were received for the Curtis XF13C, but the aircraft continued to fly for NACA in experimental work, and by VWJ-1 Squadron at Quantico.

Specifications (XF13C-3)

References

Citations

Bibliography

 Angelucci, Enzo. The American Fighter from 1917 to the present. New York: Orion Books, 1987. .

External links

F13C
Curtiss F13C
Single-engined tractor aircraft
Aircraft first flown in 1934